Josep Borrell Fontelles (born 24 April 1947) is a Spanish politician serving as High Representative of the Union for Foreign Affairs and Security Policy since 1 December 2019. A member of the Spanish Socialist Workers' Party (PSOE), he served as President of the European Parliament from 2004 to 2007 and as Minister of Foreign Affairs, European Union and Cooperation in the Government of Spain from 2018 to 2019.

Born and raised in the Catalan village of La Pobla de Segur, Borrell is an aeronautical engineer and economist by training as well as professor of mathematics. He entered politics in the 1970s as a member of the PSOE during Spain's transition to democracy, and went on to serve in several prominent positions during the governments of Felipe González, first within the Ministry of Economy and Finance as General Secretary for the Budget and Public Spending (1982–1984) and Secretary of State for Finance (1984–1991), then joining the Council of Ministers as Minister of Public Works and Transport (1991–1996). In the opposition after the 1996 election, Borrell unexpectedly won the PSOE primary in 1998 and became Leader of the Opposition and the designated prime ministerial candidate of the party until he resigned in 1999. He then switched to European politics, becoming a Member of the European Parliament (MEP) during the 2004–2009 legislative period and serving as President of the European Parliament for the first half of the term.

He returned to the Spanish Council of Ministers in June 2018, when he was appointed Minister of Foreign Affairs, the European Union and Cooperation in the Sánchez government. In July 2019, Borrell was announced as the European Council's nominee to be appointed High Representative of the Union for Foreign Affairs and Security Policy. He took office in December 2019.

Early life and career
Josep (or José) Borrell i Fontelles was born on 24 April 1947 in the Catalan village of La Pobla de Segur, province of Lleida, near the Pyrenees, son of Joan Borrell (father) and Luisa Fontelles Doll (mother). He grew up in the village, where his father owned a small bakery. His paternal grandparents were Spanish immigrants in Argentina, where they ran a bakery in the city of Mendoza, close to the General San Martín Park. They returned to Spain when Joan Borrell, Josep's father, was eight years old. Borrell's father arrived in Spain just before the outbreak of the Spanish Civil War and afterwards he would never leave his village of La Pobla de Segur.

After completing primary education, the remote location of his village led Josep Borrell to be home-schooled with aid from his mother and a retired teacher, taking the official Baccalaureate exams at the Lleida high school. He continued his higher education thanks to several scholarships, including from the March Foundation and the Fulbright Program. In 1964 he moved to Barcelona to study industrial engineering, but left after a year in 1965 to study aeronautical engineering at the Technical University of Madrid (UPM), graduating in 1969. In the summer of 1969 Borrell worked as volunteer at the Gal On kibbutz in Israel, where he met his future French wife Caroline Mayeur, from whom he is now divorced. During this time he also began to study a bachelor's degree and later a PhD in economics at the Complutense University of Madrid (UCM). Borrell also holds a master's degree in applied mathematics (operations research) from Stanford University in Palo Alto (California, US), and a postgraduate in energy economics from the French Institute of Petroleum in Paris (France). In May 1976 Borrell defended his PhD thesis in economics at the UCM.

From 1972 to 1982 he lectured in mathematics at the Higher Technical School of Aeronautical Engineering of the UPM. In 1982 he was appointed associate professor of Business Mathematics at the University of Valladolid. From 1975 to 1982 he also worked for Cepsa, employed at the company's Department of Systems and Information Engineering; he combined this activity with the teaching of university classes and involvement in local politics.

Political career

Involvement in local politics 
Borrell joined the Spanish Socialist Workers' Party (PSOE) in 1975 and started his political activity during Spain's transition to democracy in the Socialist Grouping of Madrid along with Luis Solana and Luis Carlos Croissier. He ran for office as the number 5 in the PSOE list for the 1979 municipal election in Majadahonda, becoming city councillor. Borrell also became a member of the 1979–1983 corporation of the Provincial Deputation of Madrid and managed the Financial Department of the provincial government body in the pre-autonomic period.

Role during the González's governments 

In the 1982 general election the PSOE won a landslide victory, returning the socialists to power for the first time since the years of the Second Republic. Under Prime Minister Felipe González, Borrell was appointed to several prominent positions within the Ministry of Economy and Finance, first as General Secretary for the Budget and Public Spending (1982–1984), and then as Secretary of State for Finance (1984–1991). During his tenure as Secretary of State for Finance, Spain joined the European Economic Community in 1986. He became known for his actions seeking to combat fraud and tax evasion, going after the rich and famous, including celebrities such as Lola Flores, Marujita Díaz or Pedro Ruiz. In the 1986 general election he was for the first time elected to the Congress of Deputies, remaining as an MP representing Barcelona until 2004.

In 1991 he joined the Council of Ministers as Minister of Public Works and Transport.

He took a role in the process of liberalization of telecommunications in Spain, promoting the 1991–2001 National Plan of Telecommunications (PNT); in 1993, Borrell threatened nonetheless the European Commission with blocking the liberalization unless the concession of a moratory Spain was given, as Borrell deemed imperative to achieve first the universalization of service before the complete liberalization.

Following the 1993 general election, Borrell continued with a seat at the Council of Ministers, assuming the portfolio of Minister of Public Works, Transports and Environment in the last government presided by Felipe González. He left the office after the arrival to power of the People's Party in 1996, remaining as an MP for Barcelona in the Spanish Congress.

Brief spell as leader of the opposition 
In 1998 Borrell decided to run against the PSOE's then party leader Joaquín Almunia in the first national primary election ever held in the PSOE since the Second Republic, intended to determine who the party would nominate as its prime ministerial candidate vis-à-vis the 2000 general election. Borrell ran as the underdog, campaigning as the candidate of the socialist base against the party establishment, and surprisingly won the voting, commanding 114,254 of the member's votes (54.99%), versus the 92,860 (44.67%) obtained by Almunia. Thus began an uneasy relationship and power-sharing—the "bicefalia" (duumvirate)—between the official party leader, Almunia, and the prime ministerial candidate elected by the members in the primaries, Borrell. However, in May 1999, a fraud investigation was launched into two officials whom, several years earlier, Borrell had appointed to senior posts in the finance ministry. Though not involved in the inquiry into property purchases, Borrell resigned from the role of Prime Ministerial candidate, stating that he did not want the affair to damage his party's chances in the upcoming local and general elections.

Involvement in European politics 

Amid the sixth term of the Cortes Generales, Borrell was elected to chair the Joint Congress-Senate Committee for the European Union in October 1999, replacing Pedro Solbes. Reelected as MP for Barcelona in the 2000 general election, Borrell repeated as president of the Joint Committee for the European Union for the full 7th parliamentary term. Then, in 2001, Borrell was also appointed the Spanish parliament's representative on the Convention on the Future of Europe. In 2011 he was awarded Spain's medal of the Order of Constitutional Merit in recognition of his participation in this convention, which drafted the European Constitution that eventually led to the Treaty of Lisbon. During his time at the convention, he unsuccessfully pushed for a mention to a "federal model" in the draft, as well as he advocated for the explicit mention of the equality between women and men. A laicist, he also opposed then the inclusion of the notion of a "Christian heritage" in the text.

In 2004, prime minister and PSOE's leader José Luis Rodríguez Zapatero proposed Borrell to lead the Socialist Ticket in the 2004 European elections. The PSOE won the elections with 6,6 million votes (43,30%), obtaining 25 MEP seats, although turnout was relatively low at 46%. Borrell sat with the Party of European Socialists (PES) group, and served as leader of the Spanish delegation.

In July 2004 Borrell was elected President of the European Parliament, as a result of an agreement between the EPP and the Socialists, becoming the third Spaniard to hold this position after Enrique Barón and José María Gil-Robles. In the presidential vote, out of 700 Members of the European Parliament (MEPs) he received an absolute majority with 388 votes in the first ballot. The other two candidates were the Polish Liberal Bronisław Geremek (208 votes) and the French communist Francis Wurtz (51 votes). He was the first newly elected MEP to hold the post since direct elections were held in 1979. As part of a deal with the conservative faction in the parliament, the EPP, he was succeeded as president of the parliament by the German conservative politician Hans-Gert Pöttering in the second part of the five-year term.

In his capacity as president, Borrell also chaired the Parliament's temporary committee on policy challenges and budgetary means of the enlarged Union 2007–2013. From 2007 until leaving the Parliament in 2009, he served as chairman of the Committee on Development. In addition to his committee assignments, he was a member of the Parliament's delegation to the ACP–EU Joint Parliamentary Assembly.

Step back from the political front 

Borrell was nominated president of the European University Institute on 12 December 2008, and assumed this position in January 2010. In 2012, he was forced to resign after failing to disclose a financial relationship with Abengoa, due to being paid €300,000 yearly as board member for the company.

In 2012, the University of Lleida appointed Borrell to a professorship of competition and regional development sponsored by energy company Repsol. He also held the Jean Monnet Chair at the Institute of International Studies at Complutense University of Madrid.

Borrell collaborated along other prominent PSOE figures such as Cristina Narbona, José Félix Tezanos and Manuel Escudero in the making of Somos socialistas. Por una nueva socialdemocracia ("We are socialists. For a new social-democracy"), a manifesto in support of Pedro Sánchez's successful bid to the leadership of the PSOE in the May 2017 PSOE primary election prior to the 39th Federal Congress of the party.

He also stood out as one of the most outspoken opponents of Catalan secessionism. Borrell co-authored Las cuentas y los cuentos de la independencia ("The calculations and tales behind independence"), a 2015 essay that vowed to dismantle the economic arguments laid out by the pro-independence movement. He also took a leading role in a mass rally defending the unity of Spain held in Barcelona on 8 October 2017, in which Borrell gave an impassionated speech demanding "not to bring up more frontiers" while displaying a European Union flag that he called "our estelada" (starred flag), bringing him back to the media first line. He also took part on a second mass rally on 29 October 2017 under the slogan "We are all Catalonia".

Foreign Minister, 2018–2019 

Following the 2018 successful motion of no confidence against Mariano Rajoy and subsequent investiture of Pedro Sánchez as new prime minister, Borrell was announced on 5 June as Sánchez's choice for the post of foreign minister in his new government. 22 years after the end of his last tenure as member of the Government of Spain, Borrell assumed the portfolio of Foreign Affairs, European Union and Cooperation on 7 June along the rest of the new cabinet in La Zarzuela. The new ministry relocated some of the high-rank officials appointed by the government of Mariano Rajoy with a diplomatic background to ambassadorial posts, including secretaries of State and, most notably, the former foreign minister (Alfonso Dastis) and the prime minister's chief of staff (Jorge Moragas).

Borrell decided to reformulate the High Commissioner for the 'Marca España' (Spain Brand), a one-person body functionally dependent directly on the presidency of the Government but organically included within the Foreign Office structure) to the post of Secretary of State for Global Spain. The officeholder responsible for the 'Marca España' appointed by Rajoy, Carlos Espinosa de los Monteros y Bernaldo de Quirós, was replaced by Irene Lozano.

In June 2018, Borrell and King Felipe VI made an official visit to the US. Borrell had a meeting with Mike Pompeo, where the Spanish delegation expressed concern over the US protectionist drift; discrepancies were found between the two countries in their approach to migration policies.

In September 2018, the Comisión Nacional del Mercado de Valores (CNMV) settled a disciplinary action against Borrell opened in 2017 due to the latter's insider trading in the sale of stocks of Abengoa (whose board of directors Borrell was a member of) in November 2015, sanctioning him with a fine of €.

Regarding the negotiations with the United Kingdom on Gibraltar in the context of Brexit, Borrell vowed to prioritise improvement of the living conditions in neighbouring Campo de Gibraltar (he reportedly considered the reality of the "3rd territory with the highest GDP per capita in the World"—Gibraltar—surrounded by "a flatland of underdevelopment"—the Campo de Gibraltar—as something unacceptable). On the other hand, he renounced attempts to include the longstanding bid for sovereignty as an element of the negotiations. Borrell highlighted the fact that this soft approach was the same stance used by his predecessor, Dastis, outlining a continuity in the negotiations with the former government, with the ministry keeping the same negotiating team as before the government change. In November 2018, he signed four MoUs negotiated with the United Kingdom, settling aspects of the future relationship with the British Overseas Territory.

Given the aggravation of the political crisis in Nicaragua, in December 2018 Borrell pressed EU High Representative for Foreign Affairs Federica Mogherini for EU-wide involvement in the situation.

In May 2019, the Spanish Embassy in Caracas lodged Venezuelan dissident Leopoldo López as a guest following the Venezuelan uprising, as the latter had been freed from domiciliary imprisonment by forces endorsing Juan Guaidó. However, Borrell warned Spain was not going "to allow the embassy to become a centre of political activism", vowing to restrict the political activities of López as a guest.

For the 2019 European Parliament election in Spain, Borrell ran first in the PSOE list. During the electoral campaign, he appealed to the unity of Europe and stressed the need for EU member states to pool sovereignty in order to survive as a civilization. Shortly after his election, he gave up his newly-won seat before the inaugural session of the legislature, arguing that acting Prime Minister Pedro Sánchez and he had agreed that, amid the uncertainty regarding the second investiture of Sánchez, the post of foreign minister should not be left vacant for an indefinite period.

In October 2019, Borrell condemned the Turkish offensive into north-eastern Syria against Syrian Kurds, adding that "We don't have magic powers" to stop the Turkish invasion.

He stepped down from the office on 29 November 2019 and was succeeded ad interim by the Minister of Defence, Margarita Robles.

European Union High Representative for Foreign Affairs and Security Policy

On 2 July 2019, President of the European Council Donald Tusk announced that the European Council would nominate Josep Borrell as High Representative of the Union for Foreign Affairs and Security Policy. The portfolio had been reportedly beefed up with additional responsibilities in humanitarian aid, support of development policies in Africa and the external dimension of immigration. Also in July 2019 he announced the acquisition of double Argentine–Spanish citizenship, assumed on 18 July 2019, thus gaining the citizenship his father was born with.

He passed the hearing before the EP Committee on Foreign Affairs (AFET) on 7 October 2019. His nomination was green-lighted the next day by a vote of AFET members.

To counter its negative image in the EU, China sent medical aid and supplies to EU countries affected by the COVID-19 pandemic. Borrell warned that there is "a geopolitical component, including a struggle for influence through spinning and the 'politics of generosity'." He also said that "China is aggressively pushing the message that, unlike the US, it is a responsible and reliable partner."

Borrell said that proposed Israeli annexation of the West Bank "could not pass unchallenged" and warned that "failure to adequately respond would encourage other states with territorial claims to disregard basic principles of international law". He said that "In line with international law and relevant U.N. Security Council resolutions, the EU does not recognize Israel's sovereignty" over the Palestinian territories occupied since 1967. Borrell hailed the peace agreement between Israel and the United Arab Emirates as benefiting both nations and being important for stability in the Middle East. He also called Israeli suspension of its annexation plans positive and stated that the European Union hoped for a two-state solution.

On 9 April 2020, Borrell, on behalf of the EU, with the release of the first report of the Investigation and Identification Team to the Executive Council of the Organisation for the Prohibition of Chemical Weapons and to the Secretary-General of the United Nations on 8 April 2020, declared that "We fully support the report’s findings and note with great concern its conclusions. The European Union strongly condemns the use of chemical weapons by the Syrian Arab Air Force as concluded by the report. Those identified responsible for the use of chemical weapons must be held accountable for these reprehensible acts."

On 24 April, the EU's foreign security policy agency, the European External Action Service (EEAS), published a report on disinformation related to the COVID-19 pandemic. The New York Times reported that the language had been toned down amid criticism from China. The final report differed in key areas from both an internal version and an earlier draft planned for public release. At a parliamentary hearing on 30 April, Borrell acknowledged that China had expressed concerns about the report after it leaked but he denied the EU had bowed to pressure or that the report had been revised. Borrell said that there were two separate reports, one for internal consumption and one for publication. Responding to questions from members of the European Parliament, Borrell accused staff of damaging the EU by leaking. He also appeared to suggest that analysts' views were biased and cast doubt on their credibility: "I cannot accept that the personal belief or feeling of a member of staff leaking mails—maybe being written to be leaked—created damage to the credibility of the institution", he said, later asking MEPs why "more credibility" was being given "to the personal opinion of a member of a staff".

Multiple EU officials told BuzzFeed News and The New York Times that they were angry and disappointed by Borrell's focus on leaks and, in particular, his singling out of junior staff members.

Concerning the long-standing Aegean dispute between Turkey and Greece, Borrell in August 2020 expressed "full solidarity" with Greece and Cyprus (Turkey has occupied northern Cyprus since July 1974) and called for "immediate deescalation" by Turkey and "reengaging in dialogue."

In October 2020, Borrell called on Armenia and Azerbaijan to cease fighting in the disputed Nagorno-Karabakh region and return to the negotiating table.

In February 2021, Borrell voiced "strong concern" about China's "treatment of ethnic and religious minorities, in particular" ethnic Uyghurs in Xinjiang. In March 2021, he said China's sanctions on EU officials had created "a new atmosphere" and "a new situation".

Although warned against doing so by several EU countries, Borrell decided on his own initiative to make the first high-level EU trip of its type in four years to Russia amidst the 2021 Russian protests, to meet with Russian Foreign Minister Sergey Lavrov. The visit was described by MEPs, diplomats and other political observers as a humiliation for Borrell, as he stood by while Lavrov called the EU an "unreliable partner" and Russia expelled three EU diplomats while Borrell and Lavrov held their joint press briefing. This led to a group of over 70 MEPs to call for Borrell's resignation.

In May 2021, Borrell called for a ceasefire between Israel and the Palestinian Islamist group Hamas.

In June 2021, the Spanish newspaper ABC published a mail that described that Borrell had informed the Cuban embassy about the debate in the European Parliament about the situation in Cuba and that showed his intention to stop the debate and prevent it from reaching the Parliament's floor. A group of at least 16 MEPs asked Borrell for explanations.

In August 2021, Borrell received criticism for sending a ranking EU representative to attend the inauguration of Iranian president Ebrahim Raisi. Some members of the European Parliament believed that sending a senior diplomat "... contradicts European commitments to uphold and stand for human rights."

In September 2021, Borrell compared the situation on the Belarus–Poland border to the migrant crisis on the Morocco–Spain border.

In October 2021, he went to Saudi Arabia after visiting Qatar and the United Arab Emirates. Borrell said that the EU "now has human rights dialogues with all Gulf States and we launched such a dialogue with Saudi Arabia this week. This is an area where there is much to gain for both sides from closer cooperation."

On 8 October 2021, Borrell said the EU's relations with Turkey has significantly improved and he called his relationship with Turkish President Recep Tayyip Erdoğan "excellent".

On 18 October 2021, Borrell argued that the 2021 global energy crisis had "deep geopolitical roots. ... the price of gas, the scarcity, is something that has to be looked at from a geopolitical perspective."

In December 2021, he criticised EU member states for not imposing sanctions on Ethiopia, which was accused of war crimes during the Tigray War. Borrell said the situation in Ethiopia was "one of my biggest frustrations" of the year because the EU was not able to react properly to the large-scale human rights violations, "mass rapes using sexual violence as a war arm, killings and concentration camps based on ethnic belonging."

On 22 February 2022, after Russia recognised the breakaway Donetsk People's Republic and Lugansk People's Republic and subsequently sent troops into the two regions, Borrell issued a statement condemning the actions and called upon Russia to return to the tenets of the Normandy Format. Following the Russian invasion of Ukraine on 24 February, Borrell and European Commission president Ursula von der Leyen were part of an EU delegation visiting Kyiv on 8 April. Borrell said he wants EU countries to confiscate frozen foreign-exchange reserves of the Russian central bank—which amount to over $300 billion—to cover the costs of rebuilding Ukraine after the war.

On October 13, 2022, when speaking at the European Diplomatic Academy's inauguration ceremony in Bruges, Belgium, Borrell declared that "Europe is a garden and the rest of the world is a jungle." He added that the garden could be invaded by the jungle and that the gardeners would need to travel there in order to defend it. On October 18, in response to his comments, the Ministry of Foreign Affairs of the United Arab Emirates summoned the acting head of the EU mission at UAE to explain Borrell's remarks, stating that the remarks were "inappropriate and discriminatory" and "contribute to a worsening climate of intolerance and discrimination worldwide."

Other positions
Corporate boards
 Abengoa, member of the board of directors (2009–2016)

Non-profit organizations
 Instituto Cervantes, ex officio member of the board of trustees (since 2018)
 European Institute of the Mediterranean (IEMed), member of the board
 European Movement International, member of the board of trustees
 Fundación Focus, member of the board of trustees	
 Graduate School for Global and International Studies, University of Salamanca, member of the advisory board
 Jacques Delors Institute, member of the board of directors
 Reporters Without Borders (RWB), member of the emeritus board 
 Global Progressive Forum (GPF), chairman (2007–2011)

Honours

National honours
 1996 – Grand Cross of the Order of Charles III
 2000 – Grand Cross of the Order of Isabella the Catholic
 2007 – Grand Cross of the Order of the Civil Merit
 2011 – Medal of the Order of Constitutional Merit

Foreign honours
 2006 – Grand Order of Queen Jelena
 2015 – Commander of the Légion d'Honneur, France
 2019 – Grand Cross of the Order of the Sun of Peru

Personal life

Borrell was first married to French sociologist Carolina Mayeur. The marriage produced two sons, Joan, a diplomat, and Lionel, an aircraft pilot. Borrell and Mayeur divorced in the 1990s. Since 1998, Borrell has been in a relationship with Cristina Narbona, current president of the PSOE and former Minister of Environment (2004–2008). The couple, resident in Valdemorillo since 2001, married in July 2018.

In 2019, he acquired Argentine citizenship through descent, stating that he wished to honour the memory of his father, who grew up in Mendoza, Argentina.

Borrell speaks Spanish, Catalan, Italian, French and English.

He has been a keen participant in the annual festivity in his native Pobla de Segur descending the Noguera Pallaresa river, in which the stream is rowed down by the partakers as log drivers.

Electoral history

Controversies
In November 2018 the national stock market regulator in Spain concluded that Borrell traded shares of the company Abengoa while in posssession of insider information.  Borrell was fined 30,000 euros for the breach.

Publications
Authored books
 
 
 
 
 
Co-authored books

Notes

References

External links
 

Official biography
Josep Borrell

|-

|-

|-

|-

|-

|-

|-

|-

|-

1947 births
Politicians from Catalonia
City councillors in the Community of Madrid
Complutense University of Madrid alumni
Foreign ministers of Spain
Living people
Members of the 3rd Congress of Deputies (Spain)
Members of the 4th Congress of Deputies (Spain)
Members of the 5th Congress of Deputies (Spain)
Members of the 6th Congress of Deputies (Spain)
Members of the 7th Congress of Deputies (Spain)
MEPs for Spain 2004–2009
People from Pallars Jussà
Polytechnic University of Madrid alumni
Presidents of the European Parliament
Spanish Socialist Workers' Party MEPs
Spanish expatriates in the United States
Directors of Abengoa

European Commissioners 2019–2024
Spanish European Commissioners
Presidents of the European University Institute